Juan Bautista Besuzzo (born 18 January 1913, died 1980) was a Uruguayan footballer. He played in six matches for the Uruguay national football team from 1936 to 1938. He was also part of Uruguay's squad for the 1937 South American Championship.

References

External links
 
 

1913 births
1980 deaths
Uruguayan footballers
Uruguay international footballers
Footballers from Montevideo
Association football goalkeepers
Montevideo Wanderers F.C. players
Club Atlético River Plate footballers
Club Atlético Banfield footballers
Club Atlético River Plate (Montevideo) players
Sud América players
Uruguayan expatriate footballers
Expatriate footballers in Argentina